Thomas Benford (April 19, 1905 – March 24, 1994) was an American jazz drummer.

Biography
Tommy Benford was born in Charleston, West Virginia. He and his older brother, tuba player Bill Benford, were both orphans who studied music at the Jenkins Orphanage in Charleston, South Carolina. He started playing  in an orphanage band and continued with the drums for the next 60 years. He went on tour with the school band, traveling with them to England in 1914.

In 1920, he was working with the Green River Minstrel Show. Benford recorded with Jelly Roll Morton in 1928 and 1930. He also played with Duke Ellington, Fats Waller and Eddie South.
From 1932 till 1941 Benford lived in Europe, where in 1937 he participated in one of the most memorable recording sessions ever in Paris, with Coleman Hawkins, Benny Carter, Django Reinhardt and Stéphane Grappelli.

Benford died on March 24, 1994, at Mount Vernon Hospital in Mount Vernon, New York.

References 

1905 births
1994 deaths
African-American drummers
American jazz drummers
Dixieland drummers
Swing drummers
20th-century American drummers
American male drummers
20th-century American male musicians
American male jazz musicians
Harlem Blues and Jazz Band members
20th-century African-American musicians
Musicians from Charleston, West Virginia